On the Loose is a 1931 American pre-Code comedy short released by Metro-Goldwyn-Mayer, produced and directed by Hal Roach, and starring ZaSu Pitts and Thelma Todd. Laurel and Hardy make a cameo appearance.

Plot
The short begins with Thelma and ZaSu entering their shared New York apartment and complaining about all of the cheap, monotonous dates they recently have endured. In every case their boyfriends have taken them to Coney Island. The next day, while stopping along a city sidewalk, a passing car splashes them with mud and water. The young male driver stops and offers to buy them some new clothes. They accept his offer and later agree to go on a date, which yet again involves a trip, to Coney Island. The date does not go well, and they are relieved to go home.

Laurel and Hardy cameo 
At the end of the film there is a knock at Thelma and ZaSu's apartment door. Stan and Ollie appear and ask them to go on a date to Coney Island. Angered by the offer, the frustrated roommates start throwing ornaments at Stan and Oliver who beat a hasty retreat. Laurel and Hardy are on screen for only 41 seconds.

Cast
ZaSu Pitts as ZaSu
Thelma Todd as Thelma
John Loder as Mr. Loder
Claud Allister as Mr. Loder's friend
Billy Gilbert as Pierre, the dressmaker
Otto Fries (uncredited) as the belligerent bully
Stan Laurel (uncredited) as Stan
Oliver Hardy (uncredited) as Ollie
Dorothy Layton (uncredited) as bully's girlfriend

External links 
 On The Loose at the Internet Movie Database

1931 films
1931 comedy films
Films directed by Hal Roach
Films set in amusement parks
American black-and-white films
1931 short films
American comedy short films
1930s English-language films
1930s American films